Lipararchis is a genus of moths of the family Crambidae.

Species
Lipararchis aspilus (Turner, 1915), described from Australia in the genus Calamochrous
Lipararchis hyacinthopa Meyrick, 1934, the type species, described from Vunidawa on Fiji

Former species
Lipararchis tranquillalis (Lederer, 1863), now placed in the genus Bepea

References

Spilomelinae
Crambidae genera
Taxa named by Edward Meyrick